Encounters is a section of the Berlin International Film Festival's official selection. It was established in 2020 when the new leadership inaugurated, and the competitive section was aimed to introduce both narrative films and documentaries with innovative and independent perspective.

Award winners

Best film

Other awards

References

External links
Berlin International Film Festival

Berlin International Film Festival
Lists of films by award